Harfield Village, also known as Lower Claremont, is a neighbourhood in the south of Cape Town. It is located between the suburbs of Kenilworth and Claremont, Cape Town. The Arderne Gardens are located to the area's immediate north on the other side of Harflied Station. Although it is typically regarded as being part of Claremont parts of the village overlap with areas commonly regarded as being parts of lower Kenilworth. 

The area has a number of Victorian and Edwardian era cottages. Most streets are named after counties in England such as Surrey, Suffolk and Norfolk. Harfield Village probably got its name from the original Harfield Cottage, built by Thomas Mathew, one of the initial residents of Claremont.

Prior to the apartheid era Group Areas Act the area was home to around 19,000 Coloured residents. All of whom were evicted or forced to sell their property when the area was declared a whites only area in 1969.

References

Suburbs of Cape Town